XHEFO-FM is a radio station in Chihuahua, Chihuahua. Broadcasting on 92.5 FM, XHEFO is known as Súper.

History
XHEFO began operations in 1965 as XEFO-AM 680. It was owned by Francisco Luis Medina and operated by the Uranga family. Radiorama acquired XEFO in the 1980s.

In 2017, XHEFO flipped from Éxtasis Digital to Súper, a pop format, when Grupo Audiorama Chihuahua replaced Radiorama as the operator of XHEFO in its entrance into Chihuahua. The station broke from Audiorama in late 2018, by which time the format had evolved in a romantic direction.

References

Radio stations in Chihuahua
Mass media in Chihuahua City